Joseph William Ekins (15 July 1923 – 1 February 2012) was a British soldier. He gained recognition for his action as a British Army tank gunner in France during World War II, in which Ekins destroyed four German tanks near Saint-Aignan-de-Cramesnil in a day, including three Tiger I tanks (numbers 312, 009 & 314). One of his opponents on that day, 8 August 1944, was the German tank commander Michael Wittmann; whether Ekins fired the round that destroyed Wittmann's Tiger is disputed. Ekins died on 1 February 2012.

Operation Totalize 

During Operation Totalize the 1st Northamptonshire Yeomanry and elements of the 51st (Highland) Infantry Division reached the French village of St. Aignan de Cramesnil during the early morning of 8 August 1944. While B Squadron stayed around the village, A and C Squadrons moved further south into Delle de la Roque wood.

C Squadron moved to the east side of the woods and the understrength A Squadron took post in the southern portion, with '3 Troop' on the western edge of the wood. From this position they overlooked a large open section of ground and were able to watch as German tanks advanced up  158 from the town of Cintheaux. On orders from the troop commander, they held their fire until the German tanks were well within range.

Ekins, the gunner of Sergeant Gordon's Sherman Firefly (called Velikiye Luki, as A Squadron's tanks were named after towns in the Soviet Union), had yet to fire his gun in action. With the Tiger tanks in range, the order was given to fire. What followed was an almost 12-minute battle that saw Ekins destroying all three Tigers that '3 Troop' could see (there were seven Tiger tanks in the area heading north, along with some other tanks and self-propelled guns).

A short time later, the main German counter-attack was made in the direction of C Squadron. A Squadron (less Sgt Gordon, who had been wounded and had already bailed out of the Firefly) moved over to support them and in the resulting combat, Ekins destroyed a Panzer IV before his tank was hit and the crew was forced to bail out. After the battle, Ekins was reassigned to another tank within the squadron as a radio operator and remained in this position for the rest of the war.

Speculation surrounding Wittmann’s death 

After the war, Wittmann's death was attributed to 1st Polish Armoured Division, the 4th Canadian Armoured Division, the 144th Regiment Royal Armoured Corps and the Second Tactical Air Force, Royal Air Force. Reid examined these claims and dismissed them based on the units' war diaries.

In a 1985 issue of After the Battle Magazine, Les Taylor, a wartime member of the 1st Northamptonshire Yeomanry, claimed that Ekins was responsible for the destruction of Wittmann's tank. Veteran and historian Ken Tout, a member of the same unit, also published a similar account crediting Ekins. Historians have supported this position and it is the widely accepted version of events. According to Hart, Ekins's unit was positioned in a wood on the right flank of the advancing Tiger tanks. At approximately 12:47, they engaged them, halting the attack and killing Wittmann.

Reid postulates that A Squadron of the Sherbrooke Fusilier Regiment, 2nd Canadian Armoured Brigade, positioned on the left flank of the advancing German tanks, was responsible instead. Situated on the grounds of a château at Gaumesnil, the unit had created firing holes in the walls and engaged the advancing German tanks, including Tigers.

Later life 
After the war, Ekins returned to Rushden, Northamptonshire and went back to work in the shoe factories near his home town. He retired 34 years later, after becoming a manager of one of the factories. He married and had two children.

Footnotes

Sources

External links 
 Tank Museum veteran podcasts includes two by Ekins

1923 births
2012 deaths
British Yeomanry soldiers
British Army personnel of World War II
People from Rushden
Tank personnel
Northamptonshire Yeomanry soldiers